Yuba College is a public community college in Marysville, Yuba County, California. It is part of the Yuba Community College District.

The college district has an extension campus in Yuba City, California. Yuba College is one of two colleges in the district, the other being Woodland Community College in Woodland, California.

Yuba College graduates an average of 300 people each spring. Many students from there then transfer to Chico State, Sacramento State, or UC Davis.

Notable alumni 
 Merle Anthony, former professional baseball umpire
 Donald J. Butz, retired major general in the United States Air Force
 Stacy Dragila, Olympic pole vaulter 
 Elonka Dunin, former American video game developer
 Rodney Hannah, former NFL player
 John P. Kee, former gospel singer and pastor
 Dan Logue, former assemblyman in the California's 3rd State Assembly district

References

External links

California Community Colleges
Buildings and structures in Yuba County, California
Education in Yuba County, California
Marysville, California
Two-year colleges in the United States
Educational institutions established in 1927
Schools accredited by the Western Association of Schools and Colleges
Clearlake, California
Woodland, California
Yuba City, California
1927 establishments in California